LPP may refer to:

 LPP (company), a Polish clothing retailer
 LPP (gene)
 Labor-Progressive Party, Canadian Communist Party from 1943 to 1959
 Laboratoire de Phonétique et Phonologie, a French laboratory
 Labour Party Pakistan
 Latvia's First Party
 Legal professional privilege
 Legitimate peripheral participation, how newcomers become old-timers in a community of practice
 Lembaga Penyiaran Publik, a form of public broadcasting in Indonesia
 Length between perpendiculars, a ship measurement
 License Program Product, a complete software product collection
 Living Planet Programme, ESA Earth observation programme
 Ljubljanski potniški promet, a public transport company in Slovenia
 Lappeenranta Airport in Finland, by IATA code
 Lynestrenol phenylpropionate, a progestin that was never marketed
 Low-fade positive print, a type of archival color motion picture film